Crary Bank is a northeast trending undersea bank of the central Ross continental shelf. It was named, in association with Crary Ice Rise, for A.P. Crary, an American geophysicist, the name being approved by the Advisory Committee for Undersea Features in June 1988.

References
 

Undersea banks of the Southern Ocean
Landforms of the Ross Dependency